Yaprak  is a common feminine Turkish given name. In Turkish, "Yaprak" means "leaf".

People
 Yaprak Baltacioğlu, a Turkish Canadian government bureaucrat and currently the Secretary of the Treasury Board of Canada Secretariat.
 Yaprak İşçibaşı, a Turkish scholar studying cinema and television and jurist of Ankara International Film Festival.
 Yaprak Gürsoy, a Turkish scholar studying international relations theory, civil - military relations and politics in Southern Europe and academic of Istanbul Bilgi University.
 Yaprak Öz, a Turkish poet.
 Yaprak Özdemiroğlu, a Turkish ballet and actor and daughter of Atilla Özdemiroğlu (see Turkish Wikipedia article).
 Yaprak Yaltı, a Turkish author and one of the writers of Turkish Elle magazine.
 Yaprak Yılmaz, one of the contestants in Survivor: Aslanlar vs. Kanaryalar.
 Yaprak Zihnioglu, a Turkish feminist author renowned for her work on Nezihe Muhiddin.

Fictional characters
 Yaprak İzmirli, a character in Avrupa Yakası.

Turkish feminine given names